This is a list of notable coconut dishes and foods that use coconut as a primary ingredient. The term coconut can refer to the entire coconut palm or the seed, or the fruit, which, botanically, is a drupe, not a  nut.

Coconut dishes

  – a candy
  
  
  
  
 
 
  
  
  – a chocolate bar
  
  
  
  
  
  
  
  
  
  
  
  
 
 
  
  
  
 
  
  
  
  
  
  
 
  
  
  
  
  
  
  
  
  
  
  
  
  
  
  
  
  
 
  
  
  
  
  
  
  
  
  
  
  
  
  
  
  
  
  
  
  
  
  
 Kumut – a thick aromatic coconut cream in Indonesian cuisine. Used as an ingredient in nasi liwet.
  
 
  
  
  
 
  
  - a cookie
  
  
  
  
  
  – a candy
  
  
  
  
  
  
  
 
  
 
  
  
  
  
  
  
  
  
  
  
  
  
  
  
  – a coconut milk ice cream

See also

 
 List of dishes using coconut milk
 List of fruit dishes
 Lists of prepared foods

References

External links
 

Coconut